Nabors is a surname. Notable people with the surname include:

Jack Nabors (1887–1923), American baseball player
Jim Nabors (1930–2017), American actor, singer and comedian
Rachel Nabors (born 1985), American cartoonist, artist and graphic novelist
Rob Nabors (born 1971), American political advisor